Poisson d'or (meaning Fish of Gold or Gold Fish in English) is a novel by the French Nobel laureate writer J. M. G. Le Clézio. It is the story of an Arab girl whose life has many adventures. A brothel in Morocco, a Spanish slum, Parisian Bohemian life, and at last a trip to America, where she fulfills her dream of becoming a jazz singer.

Publication history
First  edition 
Large print edition

References

External links
 

1997 French novels
Novels by J. M. G. Le Clézio
Works by J. M. G. Le Clézio
Éditions Gallimard books